Artesa de Segre is a municipality in the comarca of the Noguera in Catalonia, Spain. It is situated in the valley of the Segre river, between Ponts and Balaguer. The municipal territory extends as far as the confluence of the Segre with the Boix. The Urgell canal runs through the municipality to the south of the Segre. The municipality is served by the C-1313 road between Balaguer and Ponts, and is linked to Agramunt by the L-302 road.

Demography

Subdivisions 
The municipality of Artesa de Segre include nineteen outlying villages: populations are given as of 2005.
Alentorn (143)
Anya (32)
Baldomar (127)
La Clua (19)
Colldelrat (33)
Collfred (29)
Colònia la Fàbrica
Comiols (7)
Folquer (4)
Montargull (57)
Montmagastre (22)
El Pont d'Alentorn (31)
Sant Marc del Batlliu (20)
Seró (93)
Tudela de Segre (108)
La Vall d'Ariet
Vall-Llebrera(35)
Vall-Llebrerola
La Vedrenya (15)
Vernet (42)
Vilves (58)

References

 Panareda Clopés, Josep Maria; Rios Calvet, Jaume; Rabella Vives, Josep Maria (1989). Guia de Catalunya, Barcelona: Caixa de Catalunya.  (Spanish).  (Catalan).

External links 
Official website 
 Government data pages 

Municipalities in Noguera (comarca)
Populated places in Noguera (comarca)